The Swedish Dances, Op. 63 by Max Bruch is a set of fifteen dances. They were published in two books by N. Simrock in 1892 in Berlin. There are versions for violin and piano (first version), piano four-hands, military band, and full orchestra.

Book 1
 Dance I: Einleitung (langsam, 2/4).-sehr mäßig (3/4) in D minor
 Dance II: Ruhig bewegt. (3/4) in D major
 Dance III: Frisch, nicht zu schnell. (3/4) in D minor
 Dance IV: Langsam, nicht schleppend.-Ein wenig belebter.- Langsam, nicht schleppend.  (3/4)in B-flat major
 Dance V: Ziemlich schnell. (3/4) in G minor
 Dance VI: Langsam, mit Ausdruck. (3/4)in E-flat major
 Dance VII: Lebhaft. (3/8)in B-flat major

Book 2:
 Dance VIII: Sehr mässig. (3/4)in F minor
 Dance IX: Lebhaft. (3/4)in F major 
 Dance X: Frisch, nicht zu schnell. (3/4) in D major
 Dance XI: Sehr mässig. (3/4) in B minor
 Dance XII: Langsam, nicht schleppend. (3/4) in G major
 Dance XIII: Sehr mässig.  (2/4) in A minor
 Dance XIV: Gehend, ruhig bewegt. (2/4) in A minor
 Dance XV: Sehr mässig. (3/4) in D minor

External links
 

1892 compositions
Compositions by Max Bruch